Three Days of Life and Death (German: Drei Tage auf Leben und Tod) is a 1929 German silent war film directed by Heinz Paul and starring Carl de Vogt, Angelo Ferrari and Carl Walther Meyer. It was shot at the Johannisthal Studios in Berlin and on location in Cartagena in Spain and around the Adriatic Sea. The film's sets were designed by the art director Karl Machus.

Cast

References

Bibliography
 Kester, Bernadette. Film Front Weimar: Representations of the First World War in German films of the Weimar Period (1919-1933). Amsterdam University Press, 2003.

External links

1929 films
Films of the Weimar Republic
Films directed by Heinz Paul
German silent feature films
German war films
1929 war films
World War I submarine films
German black-and-white films
1920s war adventure films
Silent war adventure films
Films shot at Johannisthal Studios
Films shot in Spain
1920s German films
1920s German-language films